Henry Piddington (7 January 1797 – 7 April 1858) was an English sea captain who sailed in East India and China and later settled in Bengal where he worked as a curator of a geological museum and worked on scientific problems, and is particularly well known for his pioneering studies in meteorology of tropical storms and hurricanes. He noted the circular winds around a calm centre recorded by ships caught in storms and coined the name cyclone in 1848.

Scientific pursuits
Henry Piddington was the third of eight (excluding a ninth child who died at infancy) children born to an innkeeper at Lewes, James John Piddington (1757–1837) and his wife, Elizabeth Ann (1762–1835). The family moved to Uckfield in 1802–03 where the Henry would have encountered travelling sailors at the inn where his father worked. Little is known of his early sailing life but he rose to command a ship and by 1824 he was living in Bengal and settled in Calcutta (city in India) around 1831 and took an interest in scientific pursuits. He worked in sugar refining and was a foreign secretary of the Agricultural and Horticultural Society of India till 1837. In 1833 he wrote Examination and analysis of some specimens of iron ore from Burdwan and On the fertilising principles of the inundations of the Hugli in the Journal of the Asiatic Society of Bengal. He was then appointed curator of the newly established Museum of Economic Geology in Calcutta in 1844 and over the next decade he continued to publish many scientific papers on geology, botany, mineralogy, and meteorology in India.

In 1832, he compiled a list of the plants of economic importance and from 1835 he wrote on a variety of topics including descriptions of fish, reviews of fossil finds in South America and on geology. He sometimes reviewed and translated content published in other journals.

Law of Storms

In 1833 a cyclone hit Calcutta and Piddington took little interest in it but in 1838 he stumbled on the "Law of Storms" by (then) Lt.-Colonel William Reid and this led him to return to his sailing experience and take an interest in ship logs. He was assisted by Captain Christopher Biden, the Master Attendant at Madras. Piddington also corresponded with R. W. Redfield who worked on storms around North America. His interest led the government to send all records of storms to Piddington from September 1839.

The result of Piddington's studies based on the logs of several ships, notably the Brig Charles Heddle which was trapped in a storm off Mauritius was his observation of the spiral wind tracks and he wrote a series of papers (24 memoirs in the Journal of the Asiatic Society of Bengal) on the topic. He noticed that the storms had a calm centre and that the winds around them ran anticlockwise in the northern hemisphere and clockwise in the southern hemisphere. This was followed by a book, The Horn-Book for the Law of Storms for the Indian and China Seas the first edition of which was published in 1844. He produced a second edition in 1848 and he introduced the word "cyclone" derived from Greek κύκλος (kyklos, meaning "circle" or "ring") based on the helical nature of the winds. The idea of the horn book was that a translucent sheet (made of horn) with the diagram of the cyclone could be placed on a map so that the wind directions could be readily compared by any sailor to identify a cyclone so that a tacking course to avoid it could be followed. A review in Nautical Magazine (1848) however claimed that it reminded the author of a children's "horn book" to teach alphabets. The book ran into many editions and Piddington was even made a president of the marine court of enquiry at Calcutta in 1851. In 1853 he advised the Governor General that Port Canning was best not built on the southeastern side of Calcutta as it was vulnerable to storms. The Port was however built there and after Piddington's death, it was devastated in 1867 by a storm and abandoned a few years later.

Other positions
Piddington held other positions as a secretary to the Agricultural and Horticultural Society; Her Majesty's Coroner of Calcutta (from 1844); and President of Marine Courts of Enquiry.

Personal life
Piddington married Jeanne Julie Josephine Gaultier de Lavalette (died 4 September 1875) and they had three sons of whom Alfred (1831-c. 1880) and Edmund (1832-1869) worked in the court at Calcutta while an older son was born in 1820 but died young in 1830. Piddington is buried in the Chandannagar cemetery.

Published works
For a list of the geological works, see the bibliography by Oldham. The following cover his major works on cyclones (he uses the word "cyclone" from his eighteenth memoir onwards.

Memoirs in the Journal of the Asiatic Society of Bengal

Books 
 The Horn-book for the Law of Storms for the Indian and China Seas, 1844
 The Sailor's Horn-book for the Law of Storms, 1848 (third edition 1860 fifth edition)
 An English index to the plants of India 1832

References 

1797 births
1858 deaths
British meteorologists
British botanists